The following are representations of the Syrian Civil War in popular culture.

Films 
 Ladder to Damascus (2013)
 Sniper: Legacy (2014)
 Phantom (2015)
 The Father (2016)
 Insyriated (2017)
 Damascus Time (2018)
 A Private War (2018)
 Sky (2021)
 Palmira (2022)
 The Swimmers (2022)

Documentaries 
 Saving Syria's Children (2013)
 The Return to Homs (2013)
 Red Lines (2014)
 Silvered Water, Syria Self-Portrait (2014)
 Ghosts of Aleppo (2014), VICE News documentary
 50 Feet from Syria (2015)
 7 Days in Syria (2015)
 Our War (2016)
 Peshmerga (2016)
 Salam Neighbor (2016)
 The War Show (2016)
 The White Helmets (2016)
 Last Men in Aleppo (2017)
 A Dangerous Dynasty: House of Assad (2018)
 The Cave (2019)
 For Sama (2019)

Video games 
 Endgame: Syria (2012)
 1000 Days of Syria (2014)
 Syrian Warfare (2017)
 Holy Defence (2018)

References

 
Syrian Civil War
Syrian Civil War